WLIJ (1580 AM) is a radio station broadcasting an Americana/Bluegrass format, licensed to Shelbyville, Tennessee.

It was one of three radio stations owned by Arthur Wilkerson of Lenoir City, Tennessee. WLIJ was one of the few AM stations to use the Motorola C-QUAM AM Stereo system.

Programming
WLIJ's programming includes "The Old-Time Country Radio Show" with Ken Fly and Paul Jones, which started with Jones and Pete Crim on WEKR in Fayetteville, Tennessee in 1998 and moved to WLIJ, still broadcast live from the BBQ Caboose Cafe in Lynchburg, Tennessee at 10 A.M. on Saturdays.

Paul and Nadine Hopkins bought WLIJ and WZNG, and Paul began a Bluegrass program which aired on WLIJ. Paul and J. Gregory Heinike began "J. Gregory Jamboree," a live two-hour program broadcast from J. Gregory's restaurant in Bell Buckle, Tennessee.

References

External links

LIJ